Papua New Guinea, a sovereign state in Oceania, is the most linguistically diverse country in the world. According to Ethnologue, there are 839 living languages spoken in the country. In 2006, Papua New Guinea Prime Minister Sir Michael Somare stated that "Papua New Guinea has 832 living languages (languages, not dialects)." Languages with statutory recognition are Tok Pisin, English, Hiri Motu, and Papua New Guinean Sign Language. Tok Pisin, an English-based creole, is the most widely spoken, serving as the country's lingua franca. Papua New Guinean Sign Language became the fourth officially recognised language in May 2015, and is used by the deaf population throughout the country.

Languages

English

English is a language of Papua New Guinea and is used by the government, courts, and the education system. In the 2011 census, 39.9% of the population was literate in English.

German

From 1884 to 1914, the northern half of the present-day country was a German colony known as German New Guinea, in which German was the official language. Tok Pisin derives some vocabulary from German as a result of this influence. Today however, German is not a generally spoken language in Papua New Guinea.

Unserdeutsch

Unserdeutsch, or Rabaul Creole German, is a German-based creole language spoken mainly in East New Britain Province. It is the only creole language that has developed from colonial German. The lexicon is derived from German, while the substrate language is Tok Pisin.

Tok Pisin

Tok Pisin is an English-based creole language spoken throughout Papua New Guinea. It is an official language of Papua New Guinea and the most widely used language in the country. In parts of Western, Gulf, Central, Oro and Milne Bay provinces, however, the use of Tok Pisin has a shorter history, and is less universal especially among older people. In the 2011 census, 68.4% of the population were literate in Tok Pisin.

Hiri Motu

Hiri Motu, also known as Police Motu, Pidgin Motu, or just Hiri, is a simplified version of the Motu language of the Austronesian language family. In the 2011 census, 4.7% of the population were literate in Hiri Motu.

Papuan languages

Outside Papua New Guinea, Papuan languages that are also spoken include the languages of Indonesia, East Timor, and the Solomon Islands.

Below is a full list of Papuan language families spoken in Papua New Guinea, following Palmer, et al. (2018):

Trans-New Guinea
Madang
Finisterre-Huon
Kainantu-Goroka
Chimbu-Wahgi
Enga-Kewa-Huli
Bosavi
East Strickland
Kutubu
Duna-Bogaya
Wiru
Ok-Oksapmin (also in Indonesia)
Anim (also in Indonesia)
Gogodala-Suki
Turama-Kikori
Kiwaian
Awin-Pa
Angan
Greater Binanderean
Dagan
Mailuan
Koiarian
Goilalan
Yareban
Kwalean
Manubaran
Torricelli
Sepik
Lower Sepik-Ramu
Border (also in Indonesia)
Sko (also in Indonesia)
Eastern Pauwasi (also in Indonesia)
Senagi (Angor-Dera) (also in Indonesia)
Kwomtari
Leonhard Schultze (Walio-Papi)
Upper Yuat (Arafundi-Piawi)
Yuat
Left May
Amto-Musan
Busa
Taiap
Yadë
Yam (also in Indonesia)
Pahoturi River
Eleman
Oriomo
Teberan
Doso-Turumsa
Dibiyaso
Kaki Ae
Kamula
Karami
Pawaia
Porome
Purari
Tabo
Baining
North Bougainville
South Bougainville
Butam-Taulil
Anêm
Ata
Kol
Kuot
Makolkol
Sulka
Yélî Dnye

Austronesian languages

People speaking languages belonging to the Austronesian family arrived in New Guinea approximately 3,500 years ago.

Austronesian languages spoken in Papua New Guinea include Meso-Melanesian languages (such as Nalik, spoken in New Ireland Province; Kuanua, spoken in East New Britain Province; and Nakanai spoken in West New Britain Province).

The Austronesian languages are widely spread across the globe, as far west as Malagasy in Madagascar, as far east as Rapa Nui in Easter Island, and as far as north as the Formosan languages of Taiwan.  Austronesian has several primary branches, all but one of which are found exclusively on Taiwan.

Papua New Guinean Sign Language

PNGSL is an official language of Papua New Guinea; it is based on Auslan and various home sign forms.

Literacy

In 2011, 67.6% of the population of Papua New Guinea over 10 years of age were literate.

See also

Papua New Guinean literature
Education in Papua New Guinea

References

Further reading

External links
Language distribution maps for individual PNG provinces (SIL International in Papua New Guinea)